Bakar-e Olya (also Romanized as Bakar-e ‘Olyā and Bekar-e ‘Olyā; also known as Bakar-e Bālā) is a village in Poshtkuh-e Rostam Rural District, Sorna District, Rostam County, Fars Province, Iran. At the 2006 census, its population was 167, in 35 families.

References 

Populated places in Rostam County